Gamble House may refer to:

 Gamble House (Pasadena, California), an Arts and Crafts style masterpiece that is a U.S. National Historic Landmark
 Gamble Plantation Historic State Park, Ellenton, Florida, listed on the NRHP in Manatee County, Florida as Robert Gamble House
 James Gamble House, Le Claire, Iowa, listed on the NRHP in Scott County, Iowa
 Dillard-Gamble Houses, Durham, North Carolina, listed on the NRHP in Durham County, North Carolina
Gamble House (Williamsburg County, South Carolina), near Nesmith, South Carolina, listed on the National Register of Historic Places in Williamsburg County, South Carolina